Mehsana district (alternate spelling "Mahesana") is one of the 33 districts of Gujarat state in western India. Mehsana city is the administrative headquarters of this district. The district has a population of over 1.8 million and an area of over 4,500  km2. There are over 600 villages in this district with a population of 2,035,064 of which 22.40% were urban as of 2011.

Mehsana district borders with Banaskantha district in the north, Patan and Surendranagar districts in west, Gandhinagar and Ahmedabad districts in south and Sabarkantha district in the east.

Major towns of the district are Mehsana, Vijapur, Bahucharaji, Satlasana, Modhera, Unjha, Vadnagar, Kalol, Kadi, Visnagar, Kherva, Jotana and Kheralu.

History

Mehsaji Chavda, a Rajput and an heir of Chavda dynasty, established Mehsana. He constructed the Toran (arc gate) of city and a temple dedicated to Goddess Toran in Vikram Samvat 1414, Bhadrapad Sud 10 (1358 AD). It is described by Jaisinh Brahmbhatt in poems of 1932 AD. It is also corroborated by Manilal Nyalchand, an author of Pragat Prabhavi Parshvanath of Samvat 1879. He also refers that Mehsaji built the temple dedicated to Chamunda. It inconclusively establishes that the town was founded during Rajput period. Another legend says that Mehsaji established it in Vikram Samvat 1375 (1319 AD).

Gaekwads conquered Baroda and established Baroda State. They expanded their rule in north Gujarat and established Patan as its administrative headquarters. Later the headquarters was moved to Kadi and subsequently to Mehsana in 1902. This northern area under Baroda was divided in 8 mahals. Gaekwad also connected the city by Baroda State railway which was opened on 21 March 1887. Sayajirao Gaekwad III built a palace known as Rajmahal in Vikram Samvat 1956 for his son Fatehsinhrao. It is now used as a district court.

Baroda state was merged with India after independence in 1947. It was included in Bombay state. Later became part of Gujarat in 1960 after partition of Bombay state into Gujarat and Maharashtra. Now Mehsana is a standalone district in north Gujarat.

Divisions 
There are 7 Vidhan Sabha constituencies in this district: Kheralu, Unjha, Visnagar, Bechraji, Kadi, Mahesana and Vijapur. Kheralu is part of Patan constituency and rest are part of Mahesana constituency.

Demographics

According to the 2011 census, Mehsana district has a population of 2,035,064, roughly equal to the nation of Slovenia or the US state of New Mexico. This gives it a ranking of 229th in India (out of a total of 640). Its population growth rate over the decade 2001-2011 was 9.91%. Mehsana has a sex ratio of 925 females for every 1,000 males, and a literacy rate of 84.26%. 25.27% of the population lived in urban areas. Scheduled Castes and Scheduled Tribes made up 7.97% and 0.46% of the population respectively.

At the time of the 2011 Census of India, 97.58% of the population in the district spoke Gujarati and 1.76% Hindi as their first language.

Mehsana district consists 10 talukas: Becharaji, Kadi, Kheralu, Mahesana, Vadnagar, Vijapur, Visnagar, Satlasana, Jotana, and Unjha. Populations as of 2011 were as follows:

Politics
  

|}

Education

Engineering colleges in Mehsana district 
Sankalchand Patel College of Engineering, Visnagar, Mehsana
S.P.B. Patel Engineering College, Saffrony Institute of Technology, Linch, Mehsana
U.V. Patel College of Engineering, Ganpat University, Kherva, Mehsana
Unjha Engineering College
L.C.I.T Institute of Technology, Bhandu
Marchant Institute of Technology, Basna, Mehsana
Government Engineering College, Katpur
Sardar Patel Institute of Technology, Piludara, Mehsana
Gujarat Power Energy Institute of Technology, Mevad, Mehsana

Pharmacy and Medical colleges in Mehsana district 
S.V. Institute of Management, Kadi, Mehsana
S.K. Pharmaceutical college of education and research, Ganpat University, Kherva, Mehsana (Also has M.Pharma)
Saffrony Institute of Technology, Linch, Mehsana
Pharmacy college in Bechraji, Mehsana
Pharmacy college in Modasa, Dist-Mehsana
GMERS Medical College, Vadnagar

Science colleges in Mehsana district 
Mehsana Urban Institute of Sciences, Ganpat University, Kherva (Second largest science college in North Gujarat)
Nootan Sciences College, Sakalchand university, Ganj bazar, Visnagar (first science college in North Gujarat)
Mehsana Urban Science College, Nagalpur, H.N.G.U University
 Smt. R.M. Prajapati Arts College

Teacher colleges in Mehsana district 
S.A.Patel B.ed College, Rampura (kukus), Mehsana

See also

References

External links 

 Official website
 Mehsana Collectorate

 
Districts of Gujarat